General elections were held in Turkey on 8 February 1935. The Republican People's Party was the only party in the country at the time.

Electoral system
The elections were held under the Ottoman electoral law passed in 1908, which provided for a two-stage process. In the first stage, voters elected secondary electors (one for the first 750 voters in a constituency, then one for every additional 500 voters). In the second stage the secondary electors elected the members of the Turkish Grand National Assembly.

Following a change in the law in 1934, women were granted the right to vote and run for election, and the age of voting was raised from 18 to 22.

See also 
 Women in Turkish politics

References

1935 elections in Turkey
1935
One-party elections